Habei (also known as Mani 玛尼) is a Southern Loloish language of Yunnan, China. Hsiu (2018) suggests that Habei belongs to the Bisoid branch.

Background
Habei is spoken in only one village, namely Habei village 哈备村, Zhemi Township 者米乡, Jinping Miao, Yao, and Dai Autonomous County, Yunnan (Jinping County Ethnic Gazetteer 2013:89, 101). The Habei people refer to their village as Kuang An (况安), meaning 'old village' (< kuang 'village' + an 'old').

The Habei still preserve traditional animist rituals.

The Habei language has been documented by Yan (1995) and He & Liu (2011).

Names
Autonyms and exonyms for the Habei are as follows (Yan 1995:60).
autonym:  (蛮尼)
Yao exonym:  (单嘎)
Lahu exonym:  (哈背)
Miao exonym:  (哈备)
Zhuang exonym:  (牙乌)
Hani exonym: ,  (哈备)

Phonology
Habei has 32 onsets and 62 rimes (Yan 1995:67). The consonant inventory is similar to that of standard Hani of Lüchun County, but also has /f/ and /v/, which Lüchun Hani does not have. Final consonants are -p, -t, -k, -m, -n, and -ŋ.

There are 6 tones. In songs, only 4 tones are recognizable (Yan 1995:67).

Phrase examples
The following Habei phrase examples are from Yan (1995:69-70). Adjectives follow head nouns.

Sentence examples
The following Habei sentence examples are from Yan (1995:68-69). Habei has SOV word order.

References

He Shaoming 何绍明; Liu Jieting 刘洁婷. 2011. 国际哈尼/阿卡区域文化调查: 中国金平县者米哈尼族哈备人文化实录. Kunming: Yunnan People's Press 云南人民出版社. 
Yan Hongxin [晏红兴]. 1995. "Jinpingxian Hanizu Habeiren qingkuang diaocha" [金平县哈尼族哈备人情况调查]. In Jinping shaoshu minzu de lishi he wenhua [金平少数民族的历史和文化], p.59-72. Kunming: Yunnan Ethnic Publishing House [云南民族出版社].
You Weiqiong [尤伟琼]. 2013. Classifying ethnic groups of Yunnan [云南民族识别研究]. Beijing: Nationalities Press [民族出版社].

Southern Loloish languages
Languages of Yunnan